Metacafe was an Israeli video-sharing website, launched in July 2003. During the mid-2000s, it was one of the largest video-sharing websites, though eventually began to be superseded by YouTube, Vimeo and Dailymotion. In August 2021, the platform's website became inactive, along with its social media pages being abandoned.

History
Metacafe Inc. was founded in July 2003 in Tel Aviv by Israeli entrepreneurs Eyal Hertzog (Chief Technical Officer) and Arik Czerniak (CEO) and raised $3 million from Benchmark Capital. In June 2006, the company closed a Series B financing round of $12 million. Investors included Accel Partners and Benchmark Capital. That September, the company moved its headquarters to Palo Alto, California and in October, Metacafe was ranked the third largest video site in the world according to comScore. It used to attract more than 13 million unique monthly U.S. viewers and streams more than 53 million videos in the U.S. each month, according to comScore Video Metrix (March 2011). The site's global audience was more than 40 million unique monthly viewers.

In its early years, Metacafe was similar to other video viewing websites such as YouTube or Dailymotion, but later turned into a short-form video entertainment. The company's partners had included marquee content providers such as major movie studios, video game publishers, broadcast and cable TV networks, music labels and sports leagues.

The site was supported through ads, and worked closely with brands in the entertainment, consumer electronics, telecommunications, consumer packaged goods, food & beverage, and automotive sectors.

In 2007, Erick Hachenburg, previously an executive with Electronic Arts, took over as CEO of the company.

In June 2012, it was reported that Metacafe had been acquired by digital talent agency, The Collective, it moved headquarters to San Francisco, California, with another office in Los Angeles.

Producer Rewards 
In October 2006, Metacafe announced its Producer Rewards program in which video producers were paid for their original content. Through this program, any video that was viewed a minimum of 20,000 times, achieved a VideoRank rating of 3.00 or higher, and did not violate any copyrights or other Metacafe community standards was awarded $5 for every 1,000 U.S. views. Pay only for U.S. views.

The program had several success stories, some of which have been featured on national TV, such as The Can Tossing Video, the Beer Launching Fridge on David Letterman, and the Ron Paul Girl series by Liv Films, that has been featured on Fox News and CNN.

Closure 
In August 2021, the website became inactive.

See also

Comparison of video hosting services
Veoh

Footnotes

References
 Bogatin, Donna. Interview with Metacafe CEO Arik Czerniak on ZDnet Blogs
 Gerson, Jen. Off the wall flips. From the Toronto Star. An article about a producer who has earned over $23,000 in Producer Rewards.
 Holahan, Catherine. Don't I know you from the Internet? From Business Week
 Marshall, Matt. Metacafe unveils producer awards, to underscore advantage over YouTube from Venture Beat
 Richmond, Will. "Metacafe Drives Community-Based Programming Model." videonuze.com, Commentary from online video news blog VideoNuze published on December 6, 2007.

External links
Metacafe Official website

American entertainment websites
Software companies of Israel
Former video hosting services
Private equity portfolio companies
2003 establishments in Israel
Internet properties established in 2003
Internet properties disestablished in 2021
2012 mergers and acquisitions